A vehicle inspection pit or grease pit is a pit or trench over which a vehicle can be driven and parked to be serviced from beneath. They are typically situated in vehicle inspection bays or garages. The use of a pit by a technician negates the need for a jack or winch. Inspection pits have to be narrow enough to fit between the wheels of a vehicle yet wide enough for a technician to work within. Access to the pit is provided by stairs or steps.

Falls into pits are common accidents in vehicle inspection bays. It is advised to place a net over unoccupied vehicle inspection pits to protect against falls.

It is important that the pit is well ventilated to prevent fires and explosions from hazardous substances.

References

Motor vehicle maintenance
Vehicle inspection